Peleng is an island off the east coast of Sulawesi, Indonesia and is the largest island of the Banggai Islands (Kepulauan Banggai). It is surrounded by the Banda Sea and Molucca Sea and has an area of 2,406 km².

Some of the smaller islands surrounding Peleng of the Banggai Islands group are Banggai Island, Bowokan, Labobo, Kebongan, Kotudan, Tropettenando, Timpau, Salue Besar, Salue Kecil, Masepe, and Bangkulu.

In January 2020 a paper  published in the journal Science documented the discovery of 10 new songbird species and subspecies, nine of them found in Peleng.

Inhabitation
The majority of people on this Peleng Island make their living planting coconuts, sweet potatoes, or fishing.

There are five district capitals on the island being Bulagi, Tataba, Liang, Salakan and Sambiut. The island's largest towns are Basiano and Bonganang.

List of towns
 Basiano
 Bongangang
 Bulagi
 Lolantang
 Lukpenenteng
 Luksagu
 Pelei
 Mumulusan
 Salakan

See also

 Peleng tarsier

References

Banggai Islands Regency
Landforms of Central Sulawesi
Islands of Sulawesi
Populated places in Indonesia